"25 Minutes" is a song by Danish soft rock band Michael Learns to Rock. It was released on 25 February 1994 on EMI as the third single and as well as the sixth track from their second studio album, Colours (1993). The song is a power ballad, written by vocalist Jascha Richter.

Track listing

Charts

References

External links
 
 
 
 
 

1993 songs
1994 singles
Michael Learns to Rock songs
EMI Records singles
Songs written by Jascha Richter
Rock ballads